This is a list of events in Scottish television from 2001.

Events

January
No events.

February
23 February – Skyline Productions is commissioned to produce Rose's Patch for BBC One, a 60-minute detective comedy set in Glasgow.

March
 30 March – The nightly Scottish opt-out of BBC Choice, BBC Choice Scotland, ends and shortly after, BBC Two's variants for Scotland are made available to digital viewers for the first time.

April
No events.

May
No events.

June
7 – 8 June – Television coverage of the 2001 general election.

July
27 July – The digital channel S2 closes following a deal with ITV Digital to screen ITV2 in Scotland.

August
11 August 
ITV in England and Wales changes its name to ITV1, due to the growing number of other ITV services, including ITV2, ITV Digital, and the ITV Sport Channel, which launches on the same day. STV and Grampian are among the channels to retain their pre-ITV1 identities.
BBC Scotland's Saturday afternoon football results show is renamed Sportscene Results. It also becomes a programme in its own right as its predecessor, Afternoon Sportscene, had been an opt-out from Grandstand'''s Final Score segment.

September
1 September – 40th anniversary of Border Television.
30 September 
40th anniversary of Grampian Television.
Border Television is taken over by Granada plc.

October
No events.

November
No events.

December
No events.

Television seriesScotsport (1957–2008)Reporting Scotland (1968–1983; 1984–present)Scotland Today (1972–2009)Sportscene (1975–present)The Beechgrove Garden (1978–present)Grampian Today (1980–2009)High Road (1980–2003)Taggart (1983–2010)Crossfire (1984–2004)Win, Lose or Draw (1990–2004)Only an Excuse? (1993–2020)Chewin' the Fat (1999–2002)Harry and the Wrinklies (1999–2002)Monarch of the Glen (2000–2005)

Ending this year
10 December – Tinsel Town (2000–2001)
20 December – Wheel of Fortune'' (1988–2001)

Deaths
17 January – Robert Robertson, 70, actor
12 June – Joseph Brady, 72, actor
Unknown – Tom Watson, 68, actor

See also
2001 in Scotland

References

 
Television in Scotland by year
2000s in Scottish television